Edward Thornton was the  speaker of 20th Legislative Assembly of Prince Edward Island from 1854 to 1858. He was the speaker during all the four sessions of the assembly.

References

Speakers of the Legislative Assembly of Prince Edward Island
Members of the Legislative Council of Prince Edward Island
19th-century Canadian politicians

Year of birth uncertain
Year of death uncertain
Colony of Prince Edward Island people